Club Deportivo Estepona was a Spanish football team based in Estepona, in the autonomous community of Andalucia. Founded in 1942, the club folded in 1994, and held home games at Estadio Francisco Muñoz Pérez, with a capacity of 4,500 people.

History
Founded in 1947, the club first reached the Tercera División in 1966, spending four campaigns in the category before suffering relegation. The return to the fourth tier occurred in 1977, after the league's restructuration, and the club subsequently established themselves in the division.

Promoted to Segunda División B in 1989, the club remained five campaigns in the category after suffering relegation in 1994; shortly after, the club suffered an administrative relegation after failing to pay the debts with past players, and subsequently folded.

Another clubs in the city followed: Unión Estepona CF (founded in 1995 and dissolved in 2014) and CD Estepona FS (founded in 2014 as a replacement to Unión Estepona). Both also reached the national divisions.

Season to season

5 seasons in Segunda División B
16 seasons in Tercera División

References

External links
ArefePedia team profile 

Football clubs in Andalusia
Association football clubs established in 1947
1947 establishments in Spain
Association football clubs disestablished in 1994
1994 disestablishments in Spain